Assam Baibhav is the highest civilian award in the State of Assam, India. On 2 December 2021, chief minister Himanta Biswa Sarma officially declared the award on the occasion of "Asom diwas" (Assam Day). The obverse of the award is an image of the Jaapi along with the words "Assam Baibhav", inscribed in Assamese script, on a Hollong tree (Dipterocarpus retusus) leaf. In 2021, the Government of Assam conferred its highest civilian award, Assam Baibhav, to Ratan Tata for "his exceptional contribution towards furthering cancer care in Assam". On 4th January 2023, Assam government decided to confer the state's highest civilian award to Dr. Tapan Saikia, renowned oncologist based in Mumbai in the field of healthcare (cancer care) and public service.

Recipients

References

Civil awards and decorations of Assam